MFC Interkas Kyiv  (ukr. Міні-Футбольний Клуб «Інтеркас» Київ), is a futsal club from Kyiv, Ukraine, and plays in Ukrainian Men's Futsal Championship.

The club is one of the most titled clubs in Ukraine.

Honours
 Extra-Liga:
 1998/99, 1999/2000, 2002/03
 Ukrainian Futsal Cup:
 1999/2000, 2000/01, 2004/05

References

External links 
  Footballfacts profile

Futsal clubs in Ukraine
Sport in Kyiv
Futsal clubs established in 1993
Sports clubs disestablished in 2007
1993 establishments in Ukraine